Anthene helpsi, the creamy ciliate blue, is a butterfly in the family Lycaenidae. It is found in Ghana and possibly Ivory Coast. The habitat consists of dense upland evergreen forests.

References

Butterflies described in 1994
Anthene